Milton White (19 June 1902 – 2 December 1978) was an  Australian rules footballer who played with Geelong in the Victorian Football League (VFL).

Notes

External links 

1902 births
1978 deaths
Australian rules footballers from Victoria (Australia)
Geelong Football Club players